Glucose 1-phosphate (also called cori ester) is a glucose molecule with a phosphate group on the 1'-carbon.  It can exist in either the α- or β-anomeric form.

Reactions of α-glucose 1-phosphate

Catabolic
In glycogenolysis, it is the direct product of the reaction in which glycogen phosphorylase cleaves off a molecule of glucose from a greater glycogen structure. A deficiency of muscle glycogen phosphorylase is known as glycogen storage disease type V (McArdle Disease).

To be utilized in cellular catabolism it must first be converted to glucose 6-phosphate by the enzyme phosphoglucomutase in a free equilibrium. One reason that cells form glucose 1-phosphate instead of glucose during glycogen breakdown is that the very polar phosphorylated glucose cannot leave the cell membrane and so is marked for intracellular catabolism. Phosphoglucomutase-1 deficiency is known as glycogen storage disease type 14 (GSD XIV).

Anabolic
In glycogenesis, free glucose 1-phosphate can also react with UTP to form UDP-glucose, by using the enzyme UDP-glucose pyrophosphorylase. It can then return to the greater glycogen structure via glycogen synthase.

β-Glucose 1-phosphate
β-Glucose 1-phosphate is found in some microbes. It is produced by inverting α-glucan phosphorylases including maltose phosphorylase, kojibiose phosphorylase and trehalose phosphorylase and is then converted into glucose 6-phosphate by β-phosphoglucomutase.

See also
 Pentose phosphate pathway
 Gerty Cori

References

Organophosphates
Monosaccharide derivatives
Phosphate esters